The Maxville Limestone is a geologic formation in Ohio. It preserves fossils dating back to the Carboniferous period.

The formation was named after the community of Maxville, Ohio.

See also

 List of fossiliferous stratigraphic units in Ohio

References

 

Carboniferous Ohio
Carboniferous southern paleotropical deposits